A number of languages of North America are too poorly attested to classify. These include Adai, Beothuk, Calusa, Cayuse, Karankawa, and Solano.

There are other languages which are scarcely attested at all.

Campbell et al.

Lyle Campbell et al. (2007) list the following extinct and nearly unattested language varieties of North America as unclassifiable due to lack of data.

Eyeish
Coree
 Sewee
Cusabo
 Shoccoree-Eno (see Eno people)
Pascagoula
Quinipissa
Opelousa
Pedee
Bayagoula
Okelousa
Congaree
 Winyaw (see Winyaw)
 Santee (see Santee tribe; distinguish Santee Sioux)
 Okchai-Chacato (see Okchai, Chatot people)
Tequesta
Guale
 Sanan
Yamasee
Akokisa
Avoyel
 Tocobaga (see Tocobaga)
Houma
 Neusiok (see Neusiok people)
 Ubate
 Cape Fear
 Pensacola (see Pensacola people)
Bidai
 Wateree (see Wateree people)
 Mobile
Michigamea
 Pakana
 Saxapahaw
 Keyauwee
Guachichil†
 Suma-Jumano† (see Suma & Jumanos)
 Huite†
 Concho†
 Jova†
 Acaxee† (see Acaxee)
 Xixime (Jijime)†
 Zacatec† (see Zacatecos; perhaps the same as Acaxee)
 Tahue†
 Guasave†
 Toboso† (see Tobosos)

† Ethnographic evidence suggests these varieties might have been Uto-Aztecan.  See Uto-Aztecan languages § Extinct languages for more.

See also
:Category:Unclassified languages of North America
List of extinct languages of North America
Uto-Aztecan languages#Extinct languages
Languages of North America

References

Unclassified, North America